Estadio Carlos Ugalde Álvarez is a multi-use stadium in Ciudad Quesada, Costa Rica.  It is currently used mostly for football matches and is the home stadium of A.D. San Carlos.  The stadium holds 5,600 people.

History
The first game at the stadium was on 24 April 1966, with San Carlos losing 1-0 to Cartaginés with Carlos García scoring the first even goal at the venue. In September 2009, the stadium hosted its 600th Primera División match.

References

Football venues in Costa Rica
Buildings and structures in Alajuela Province